Dudley Marjoribanks may refer to:

 Dudley Marjoribanks, 1st Baron Tweedmouth (1820–1894), Scottish businessman and politician
 Dudley Marjoribanks, 3rd Baron Tweedmouth (1874–1935), British army officer and courtier